Fratelli Nardi was an Italian aircraft manufacturer formed in the early 1930s.

History
The partnership Fratelli Nardi was formed by the brothers Euste, Elio and Luigi Nardi in Milan, Italy. They started building their first aircraft in 1934 and the FN.305 first flew in February 1935.

The company built a number of prototypes but due to the small size of their factory the series production of their aircraft was sub-contracted to other companies like Piaggio and Savoia-Marchetti.

Aircraft
Nardi FN.305 - 1935
Nardi FN.310 - 1936
Nardi FN.315 - 1938
Nardi FN.316 - 1941
Nardi FN.333 Riviera - 1952

See also

 List of Italian companies

References

Defunct aircraft manufacturers of Italy
Vehicle manufacturing companies established in 1934
Italian companies established in 1934
Italian brands